Epifanio “Fano” Irizarry Jusino (7 April 1915 - 3 November 2001) was a Puerto Rican oil canvas painter, draftsman, and art professor from Ponce, Puerto Rico. He exposed Costumbrismo practices of his native Puerto Rico, including bomba and plena dances, cockfighting and carnivals. During his professional lifetime, he exhibited in Puerto Rico, the United States as well as Europe, some of which were solo, and he was the winner of various prestigious awards.

Early years
Epifanio “Fano” Irizarry was born on 7 April 1915 on Calle Petardo in Clausells sector in Ponce. His parents were Ramón Irizarry, a cobbler, and Epifania Jusino, a homemaker. Since very young he showed an affinity for the arts and was encouraged to excel in painting by his father. He began his art studies with Inés Toro, and later was a student of Horacio Castaing, Librado Net and Miguel Pou.

In 1934 he moved to New York City where he took on various forms of employment and in 1941 he entered the United States Armed Forces. During his enlisted years he studied perspective in Germany  and art at the Freilassing Art Academy, Bavaria, Germany, as well as at the Bavarian National Museum in Munich. He also lived in Paris, Toulouse, Lyons, and Reims, France as well as in Luxembourg.

Schooling and career work
In the 1950s he studied at the Art Students League of New York under Reginald Marsh and Robert Brackman. He returned to Puerto Rico, and joined Taller de Gráfica of the División de Educación de la Comunidad where he was an illustrator until 1963. Subsequently, he returned to Ponce where he dedicated his time to his paintings and to art education. Some of his most outstanding students were Rigoberto Lucca Irizarry (1951–) and Ramón Luis Román (1949–).

"Irizarry was a genius in addition to a painter who with his art he memorialized into eternity the Puerto Rican Costumbrismo through themes like the bomba and plena dances, cockfighting and Paso Fino horses."

Style and characteristics
Art critics describe his stroke as broad, energetic, free style and expressive. They define his paintings as reflecting life and movement. With respect to his use of color some critics point out to the liveliness and multiplicity of his tones, while others stress his sobriety and monochromatic style. His Marinas y Veleros watercolors are a witness to the passion that Irizarry had for the sea and the shore.

Wichie Torres stated that Irizarry was not only a lover of art but of opera music as well: "He loved to sing opera, and was good at it. So part of his daily ritual while painting was playing classical music and signing along in loud voice...Curiously, Irizarry never had a telephone. The reason was that he didn't want anyone interrupting him during his creative painting process."

Paintings
Irizarry's works are preserved at the Museo de Arte de Ponce, Museo de Arte de Puerto Rico, Riverside Art Museum in New York City, Instituto de Cultura de Madrid In Spain, and in private collections in Puerto Rico, United States, and Europe.

Among his outstanding works are:
 Baile de Bomba II (1951)
 Veleros (1957)
 Caras (1959)
 Feria de Caballos (1959)
 Baile de Bomba núm. 1 (1959)
 Pescadores de Muelles (1964)
 Flamboyan" (1972)
 La Bomba (1972)
 El Palo encebao (n.d.)

Honors and legacy
During his successful art career he received awards from the Ateneo Puertorriqueño and the Instituto de Cultura Puertorriqueña as well as being the recipient of the National Academy Museum and School Award and the Guggenheim Memorial Foundation Grant.

The Ponce School of Fine Arts has an art gallery named after Irizarry.  He is also honored at Ponce's Park of the Illustrious Ponce Citizens.

Irizarry died on 3 November 2001 in his native Ponce, Puerto Rico. He was 87 years old.

See also

List of Puerto Ricans

Notes

References

Further reading

Books
Introducción a la pintura puertorriqueña. San Juan: Editorial Art, 1968.
Pintores Contemporáneos de Puerto Rico. San Juan: Ediciones Artísticas de Puerto Rico, ca. 1969.
Bloch, Peter. Painting and Sculpture of the Puerto Ricans. New York: Plus Ultra Educational Publications, 1978.
Delgado, Osiris. "Artes Plásticas, Historia de la cultura puertorriqueña". La Gran Enciclopedia de Puerto Rico, Tomo VIII. Madrid: Ediciones R, 1976.
Hermandad de Artistas Gráficos de Puerto Rico. Puerto Rico Arte e Identidad. San Juan, P.R.: Editorial de la Universidad de Puerto Rico, 1998.
Los tesoros de la pintura puertorriqueña. Museo de Arte de Puerto Rico. San Juan, P.R. 2000.
Traba, Marta. Propuesta polémica sobre arte puertorriqueño. San Juan: Ediciones Cordillera, 1971.
Kaiden, Nina; Soto, Pedro Juan; Vladimir, Andew. Puerto Rico: La Nueva Vida. New York: Renaissance Editions, 1966.

Newspapers
“22 Boricuas exhibirán en Filadelfia”. El Mundo (San Juan, PR), 26 September 1955.
“Artistas exponen sus cuadros en el Ateneo”. El Mundo (San Juan, PR), 18 August 1950.
“Casa del Arte abre exposición de pinturas y dibujos del pintor puertorriqueño Epifanio Irizarry”. El Mundo (San Juan, PR), 8 January 1965.
“Colección de arte para el pueblo”. La Perla del Sur (Ponce, PR), 19 February 1997.
“Dan el laudo en certamen de pintura”. El Mundo (San Juan, PR), 18 May 1955.
“El Instituto de Cultura inicia hoy exposición obras de Epifanio Irizarry”. El Mundo (San Juan, PR), 14 June 1963.
“Elogian Oleos Expuso Boricua en Galería NY”. El Mundo (San Juan, PR), 26 May 1958.
“En el Ateneo, Entregan Hoy Premios Certámenes de Navidad”. El Mundo (San Juan, PR), 14 December 1957.
“En Galería del Ateneo expone Epifanio Irizarry”. El Mundo (San Juan, PR), 29 February 1964.
“En UPR, Epifanio Irizarry, Ofrecerá exhibición de pinturas”. El Mundo (San Juan, PR), 12 January 1959.
“Epifanio Irizarry es Promesa Entre Alumnos de Miguel Pou”. El Mundo (San Juan, PR), 12 September 1951.
“Epifanio Irizarry gana 2do premio concurso pintura y grabado 1956 con sed auspiciado por Ateneo Puertorriqueño”. El Mundo (San Juan, PR), 13 December 1956.
“Epifanio Irizarry monta exposición en Museo UPR”. El Mundo (San Juan, PR), 28 December 1963.
“Epifanio Irizarry, pintor de PR”. La Prensa (Nueva York, NY), 11 May 1958.
“Epifanio Irizarry”. El Día (San Juan, PR), 22 August 1957.
“Exponen obras del pintor Epifanio Irizarry”. El Mundo (San Juan, PR), 14 June 1967.
“Exposición de pinturas de Epifanio Irizarry”. El Mundo (San Juan, PR), 6 July 1963.
“Inauguran Exposición colectiva de Pintura Puertorriqueña”. El Mundo (San Juan, PR), 12 April 1957. 
“Inauguran Exposición de Arte”, El Mundo(San Juan, PR), 26 January 1966.
“Pintor ponceño estudiará en EU, Es promesa entre alumnos de Miguel Pou, Asistirá a la Liga de Arte y luego irá a Italia”. El Mundo (San Juan, PR), 13 September 1950.
“Premian cuadros en Instituto”. El Mundo (San Juan, PR), 11 February 1959.
Ayoroa Santaliz, José Enrique. “Galería de Arte de Epifanio Irizarry”. El Debate, 14 February 1964.
Bertoli Rigel, Juan. “Hablando con el pintor Epifanio Irizarry”. El Día (San Juan, PR), 31 August 1957.
Cabanillas, Iris. “Abren hoy exposición Epifanio Irizarry con 60 óleos, 23 dibujos y 6 grabado”. El Mundo (San Juan, PR), 20 February 1959.
Cabrera, Alba Raquel. “Hasta el 30. Obras de Epifanio Irizarry siguen expuestas en el Ateneo”. El Mundo (San Juan, PR), 25 March 1964.
Cancel Hernández, F. “Oleos y Acuarelas, Pintor Epifanio Irizarry Inaugura Exposición Hoy”. El Mundo (San Juan, PR), 5 May 1956.    
Coates, Robert. “The Art Galleries”. The New Yorker (New York, NY), 26 January 1957, p. 81.
Meyners, Benjamin. “Inauguran Exposición de Pintores en la Isla”. El Mundo (San Juan, PR), 9 January 1957.
Rosa. S. “Instalación de murales en fábrica CFI que dirige Carlos M. Passalacqua”. El Mundo (San Juan, PR), 11 August 1954.
Skerrett, Lillian. “Oleos, Acuarelas, Dibujos Pintor Epifanio Irizarry monta exposición en SJ”, El Mundo (San Juan, PR), 15 January 1965.
Soltero, N. “Pintor boricua monta en NY una exposición”. El Mundo (San Juan, PR), 6 May 1958.
Varela, Luis. “Fallece pintor Epifanio Irizarry”. El Nuevo Día (San Juan, PR), 4 November 2001.
Vidal Armstrong, Mariano. “Epifanio Irizarry el pintor ponceño de viaje por Méjico”. El Día (Ponce, PR), 1 December 1960.
Vientos Gastón, Nilita. “Indice Cultural”. El Mundo (San Juan, PR), 9 February 1957.

External links
 Interview with Irizarry (1993)

1915 births
2001 deaths
Puerto Rican painters
Painters from Ponce
Art Students League of New York alumni